The Wadi Rabah culture is a Pottery Neolithic archaeological culture of the Southern Levant, dating to the middle of the 5th millennium BCE.

Research
This period was first identified at the ancient site of Jericho (Tell es-Sultan) by British archaeologists John Garstang and Kathleen Kenyon in separate excavations. Kenyon has named this period in Jericho "Pottery Neolithic B". The name "Wadi Rabah" was since used in archaeologic literature thanks to the works of Israeli archaeologist Jacob Kaplan at the site of Wadi Rabah.

Settlements
This culture is known from a small amount of sites, in some of which remains of small rectangular structures were discovered. Some larger structures were found in Munhata, Wadi Rabah and Ein el-Jarba, though Israeli archaeologist Yosef Garfinkel suggests that large courtyard structures were erected in that period, like the ones found at Sha'ar HaGolan of the preceding Yarmukian culture (c. 6400–6000 BCE) and Tel Tsaf of the following Early/Middle Chalcolithic period (c. 5300–4500 BCE)

Sites

Wadi Rabah
 Baysamun
 Dan
 Kfar Giladi
 HaGoshrim
 Nahal Betzet
 Tel Teo
 Kabri
 Horvat Uza
 Kiryat Ata
 Einot Tsipori
 Tel Ali
 Yizre'el
 Tel Yosef
 Abu Zurayq
 Ein el-Jarba
 Munhata
 Nahal Zehora
 Al-Shuna al-Shamalyah
 En Esur
 Abu Hamid
 Habashan street
 Lod
 Tell es-Sultan
 Kidron Valley
 Atlit Yam
 Teluliot Batashi

See also
 Yarmukian culture
 Lodian culture

References

Further reading
 

Neolithic cultures of Asia
Archaeological cultures in Israel
Archaeological cultures in Palestine
Archaeological cultures in Jordan
Late Neolithic